Villa Sarabhai, or Villa de Madame Manorama Sarabhai, is a  modernist villa located in Ahmedabad, India. Designed by the Franco-Swiss architect Le Corbusier, it was built between 1951 and 1955. It was built with an austere interior, a typical Le Corbusier design principle.

History
The villa was built for Manorama Sarabhai, the sister of Chinubhai Chimanlal.  She commissioned it in 1951 to build a home for her growing family, and it was completed in 1955.

Design
The villa is located on a verdant 20-acre park owned by Sarabhais. Corbusier decided on the vault as the villa's defining structure after taking into consideration the local climate, which is characterized by wide fluctuations of temperature and humidity.

See also 
 Villa Shodhan

References

 http://dnasyndication.com/dna/dna_english_news_and_features/Villa-Sarabhai-reflects-Corbusier%E2%80%99s-creative-genius/DNAHM61772

External links
 Foundation Le Corbusier

Le Corbusier buildings in India
Houses completed in 1955
Houses in Ahmedabad
Tourist attractions in Ahmedabad
1955 establishments in Bombay State